The women's 400 metres event at the 2001 Summer Universiade was held at the Workers Stadium in Beijing, China. The final took place on 28 and 29 August.

Medalists

Results

Heats
Held on 28 August

Semifinals
Held on 29 August

Final
Held on 29 August

References

Athletics at the 2001 Summer Universiade
2001 in women's athletics
2001